The 2015 season was the Arizona Cardinals' 96th in the National Football League (NFL), their 117th overall, their 28th in Arizona, their 10th playing home games at University of Phoenix Stadium and their third under head coach Bruce Arians. The Cardinals clinched their first NFC West title since 2009, in addition to the first 13-win season in franchise history. They also clinched a first round bye for the first time in franchise history.

The second-seeded Cardinals began their playoff run by defeating the fifth-seeded Green Bay Packers 26–20 in overtime in the divisional round, giving quarterback Carson Palmer his first career playoff win. However, they were defeated by top-seeded Carolina Panthers in the NFC championship by a score of 49–15, played in Bank of America Stadium, in Charlotte, North Carolina, with the Cardinals committing seven turnovers, tied for the most turnovers in a conference championship game since the Los Angeles Rams were defeated by the Dallas Cowboys abruptly in the 1978 season by a score of 28–0. The 2015 NFC Championship Game was a rematch of the 2008 NFC Divisional Round, which saw the 9–7 Cardinals upset the Panthers in their home stadium.

Until 2021, this was the last season in which the Cardinals would have a winning season or postseason appearance. The season was covered by the Amazon Original sports docuseries All or Nothing. The Rams returned to the Los Angeles metropolitan area after the 2015 season.

2015 draft class

Staff

Final roster

Preseason

Schedule

Regular season

Schedule

Game summaries

Regular season

Week 1: vs. New Orleans Saints
With the win, the Cardinals began their season at 1-0.

Week 2: at Chicago Bears

With the win, the Cardinals improved to 2-0.  With losses by the 49ers and Rams, they remain in first place in the NFC West.

Week 3: vs. San Francisco 49ers
49ers quarterback Colin Kaepernick threw 4 interceptions in this game, with 2 of them being returned for touchdowns. The two "pick sixes" led to the first scores of the game for Arizona. Kaepernick became the first quarterback in the Super Bowl era to throw 2 pick sixes to begin the game. Overall, the Cardinals bombed the 49ers, 47-7.

With the win, the Cardinals improved to 3-0 for the second straight season.

Week 4: vs. St. Louis Rams

The Cardinals failed to stop the Rams all game long, only being held to 5 field goals and a touchdown, as a result of ending their three-game winning streak to start the season. With their first loss, the Cardinals drop to 3-1.

Week 5: at Detroit Lions
With the win, the Cards improved to 4-1.

Week 6: at Pittsburgh Steelers
For the first time in 4 years, head coach Bruce Arians made his first return to Pittsburgh, where he served as wide receiver's coach from 2004 to 2006, as offensive coordinator from 2007 to 2011, and was part of the Steelers' Super Bowl winning teams from 2005 and 2008. The Steelers were led by backup quarterback Landry Jones in this game due to the absence of Ben Roethlisberger. Jones would have a really good game, throwing for 168 yards on only 12 throws. Carson Palmer would throw 2 interceptions while he threw the ball 45 times, completing only 29 passes in the process.

With the loss, the Cardinals fell to 4-2. In this rematch of Super Bowl XLIII, this would turn out to be the Cardinals' only road loss of the season.

Week 7: vs. Baltimore Ravens
With the win, the Cardinals improved to 5-2.

Week 8: at Cleveland Browns
The Cardinals would trail 20-10 at halftime, but they would come back to win 34-20 behind a 300-yard passing, 4-touchdown game from Carson Palmer.

With the comeback victory, the Cards improved to 6-2.

Week 10: at Seattle Seahawks
Arizona would trail 29-25 in the fourth quarter, but they would outscore Seattle 14-3 in the final 5 minutes. Carson Palmer would throw for 300 yards for the second straight week, and threw 3 touchdowns.

With the win, Arizona improved to 7-2.

Week 11: vs. Cincinnati Bengals

The Cardinals would build leads of 28-14 and 31-21 in the third and fourth quarters, but the Bengals would come back to tie the game 31-31 on a Mike Nugent field goal. Arizona would then march down the field to win the shootout on a field goal from Chandler Catanzaro with 1 second left.

With the win, the Cardinals improved to 8-2.

Week 12: at San Francisco 49ers
With the win, Arizona improved to 9-2 and swept the 49ers for the first time since their 2008 Super Bowl season.

Week 13: at St. Louis Rams
With the win, the Cardinals improved to 10-2.

Week 14: vs. Minnesota Vikings

With their seventh straight win, the Cardinals improved to 11-2 and clinched a spot in the NFL playoffs.

Week 15: at Philadelphia Eagles
With the win, the Cardinals won 12 games (not including playoffs) in one season for the first time in their 96-year history and clinched their first ever first-round bye in the playoffs.

Week 16: vs. Green Bay Packers
A defense forcing 4 turnovers and sacking Aaron Rodgers 9 times, combined with Carson Palmer throwing for 265 yards, 2 touchdowns and only 1 interception, gave the Cardinals a 38-8 blowout against the Packers.

With the win, the Cardinals improved to 13-2.

Week 17: vs. Seattle Seahawks

Against the Seahawks, the Cardinals had a chance to move to the #1 spot in the NFC standings with a win and a Carolina Panthers loss to the Buccaneers. At halftime, down by 24 points (and with Carolina leading Tampa Bay 24-3), notable starters including quarterback Carson Palmer were pulled from the game.

Postseason

NFC Divisional Playoffs: vs. (5) Green Bay Packers

In a rematch of week 16, the Cardinals once again faced the Packers. This was the first playoff game between the teams since 2009, a game the Cardinals ended up winning 51-45 in overtime, setting the record for the most points scored combined in a playoff game.

The Cardinals would strike first when Carson Palmer found Michael Floyd for an 8-yard touchdown to put them up 7-0. On Green Bay's first drive, they would go down the field and get a field goal from Mason Crosby from 28 yards out to make the score 7-3. Green Bay would get another field goal before the half to cut the lead to 7-6. The Packers would then get the lead after Jeff Janis caught an 8-yard touchdown pass to give them a 13-7 lead. Arizona would cut the deficit to 13-10 after Chandler Catanzaro kicked a 28-yard field goal. In the fourth quarter, the Cardinals would take the lead after Michael Floyd caught another touchdown that was tipped by Packers cornerback Demarious Randall in the end zone. The Cardinals would get some insurance with 1:55 left after Catanzaro kicked a 36-yard field goal to make it 20-13. The Packers would get the ball back with a chance to tie the game. With 55 seconds left in regulation, the Packers faced a 4th and 20 from their own 4-yard line. Aaron Rodgers would end up throwing a 61-yard pass to Jeff Janis to put the Packers at the Cardinals 35-yard line. Later, with 5 seconds remaining, Rodgers would throw another Hail Mary pass to Janis to tie the game at 20 and force overtime. Rodgers had thrown a hail mary at Detroit earlier in the season, making him the first quarterback in NFL history to throw 2 Hail Marys in the same season.

With the game in overtime, the Cardinals won the toss. On the first play from scrimmage, Palmer threw a 75-yard pass to Larry Fitzgerald to the Packers 4-yard line. Two plays later, Palmer ended the game after he flipped a pass to Fitzgerald on a draw play to end the game and send the Cardinals to the NFC Championship game against 1 seeded Carolina.

With the win, the Cardinals improved to 14-3, remain the only team in the NFL to be undefeated at home in the playoffs, and advanced to the NFC Championship game for the first time since 2008.

NFC Championship: at (1) Carolina Panthers

After the Cardinals called heads to win the coin toss, Carolina dominated the game from start to finish.  With the loss, the Cardinals finished the season with an overall record of 14–4.  They also turned the ball over 7 times in a Championship game.  It would tie the most giveaways in a single conference championship game with the 1978 Rams.

Records, milestones, and notable statistics

Week 2 
 David Johnson set a Cardinals' record with a 108-yard kick return for a touchdown.
 David Johnson also became the first NFL player to have a rushing, receiving, and kick return touchdown in their first two games.

Week 17
 Carson Palmer was a finalist for NFL MVP, coming in 2nd, and receiving 1 vote, which tied him with Tom Brady. 

Team
 Most wins in a season in Cardinals history (13 regular season, 14 including playoffs)
 Most points scored in the regular season: 489 points scored (30.6/game)

Standings

Division

Conference

Notes

References

External links
 

Arizona
Arizona Cardinals seasons
Arizona Cardinals
NFC West championship seasons